"The Edge of Innocence" was an American television film broadcast on November 7, 1957, as part of the CBS television series, Playhouse 90. It aired as the ninth episode of the second season.

Plot
A lawyer, Robert Rainey, defends a friend, Lowell Williams, who is charged with murder.

Cast
The cast included performances by:
 Joseph Cotten as Robert Rainey
 Teresa Wright as Carol Morton
 Maureen O'Sullivan as Julia Williams
 Beverly Garland as Gay Sherman
 Lorne Greene as Lowell Williams
 Dan Barton as Jay Pauling
 DeForest Kelley as Lambert

Production
Arthur Hiller was the director and Eva Wolas the producer. Berne Giler wrote the script. The film was produced by Screen Gems for Playhouse 90.

Reception
In The New York Times, Jack Gould wrote that "absurdities were plentiful" and Berne Giler's familiarity with legal procedure was "remote" and his knowledge of play-writing "even more distant." He did credit Cotten with "a competent portrayal as a defense attorney."

References

1957 American television episodes
Playhouse 90 (season 2) episodes
1957 television plays